James P. Wade, Jr. is the author, with Harlan K. Ullman of the doctrine of strategic dominance, more popularly known as shock and awe. They published their concept in Shock and Awe: Achieving Rapid Dominance, a 1996 monograph of the National Defense University.

In 1977, he was appointed by President Jimmy Carter as Chairman of the Military Liaison Committee to the United States Department of Energy.

References

External links
 
 The American Presidency Project 

1930 births
Living people
People from Missouri
American military writers